Five (stylized as V)  is the fifth studio album by American rap rock band Hollywood Undead. It was released on October 27, 2017 through  MDDN and BMG. It is the first album to not feature Matthew "Da Kurlzz" Busek who departed from the band in early 2017. It is also the first release for BMG Rights Management since they departed from Interscope Records, successor of A&M Octone Records, its first label they signed, after release of Day of the Dead. The album features guest vocal appearances from B-Real of Cypress Hill.

Background
Vocalist Johnny 3 Tears spoke about the album title, stating "We’re five brothers, and this is our fifth record. Nothing gets to the essence of the music like this number does. Numerology has a lot of power. When we said Five, it just made sense. The fact that we could all agree on one word codifies who we are."

Even though it was not released as a single, the track "Riot" was certified three times platinum in Brazil by the PMB.

Track listing

Personnel 
Credits adapted from AllMusic.

Hollywood Undead
 Jorel "J-Dog" Decker – vocals, guitars, bass, keyboards, programming, composition, producer
 Dylan "Funny Man" Alvarez – vocals, soundboards
 George "Johnny 3 Tears" Ragan – vocals, bass, composition
 Jordon "Charlie Scene" Terrell – vocals, guitars, composition, producer
 Daniel "Danny" Murillo – vocals, keyboards, programming, guitars, bass, composition

Additional musicians
 B-Real – guest vocals on "Black Cadillac"
 Oliver Clinger – additional vocals on "California Dreaming"
 Liam Clinger – additional vocals on "California Dreaming"
 MUSYCA Children's Choir – additional vocals on "California Dreaming"
 Tiah Barnes – additional vocals
 Kate Crellin – additional vocals
 Isabella Custino – additional vocals
 Ernest Harrison – additional vocals
 Da'jon James – additional vocals
 Dean Butterworth – drums on "California Dreaming", "We Own the Night" and "Bang Bang"
 Tommy Lee – drums on "Pray (Put 'Em in the Dirt)"
 Colin Schwanke – drums on "Renegade"
 Griffin Boice – guitars, piano, strings on "Pray (Put 'Em in the Dirt)", composition, producer
 Danny Lohner – guitars, bass on "Pray (Put 'Em in the Dirt)"
 Henry Flury – guitars on "Renegade"

Additional personnel
 Sean Gould – producer
 Jason Hradil – product manager
 Dan Lancaster – mixing
 Rhys May – mixing assistance
 Ted Jensen at Sterling Sound, NYC – mastering
 Courtney Ballard – composition
 Jared Poythress – composition
 James Knerr – A&R
 Randall Leddy – art direction, design
 Taylor Bringuel – photography
 Jack Stark – photography

Charts

References

2017 albums
Hollywood Undead albums